The 2022 Ping An Chinese Football Association Super League was the 19th season since the establishment of the Chinese Super League. The league title sponsor is Ping An Insurance.

On May 23, the league was confirmed to start from June 3.

Affected by the epidemic, the competition system is still adopted in the first stage of this season, and it is planned to return to the home and away competition system from August 5, 2022 (from 11th round).

Format
The format of the season was revealed on 13 May 2022. In the first stage (round 1-10), 18 teams will be divided into three groups. The hosts were allocated to each group and other teams will be drawn based on last season's rankings.

Groups
The draw for the first stage was revealed on 13 May 2022.

Centralised venues
Meizhou (Group A)
Hengbei Football Town Field No.9
Meixian Tsang Hin-chi Stadium
Wuhua County Olympic Sports Centre
Haikou (Group B)
Haikou Mission Hills Football Training Base
Wuyuan River Stadium
Wuyuan River Stadium Outer Field No.2
Dalian (Group C)
Jinzhou Stadium
Puwan Stadium
Jinjiang
Jinjiang Football Training Center Stadium
Jinjiang Sports Center Stadium

Clubs

Club changes

To Super League
Clubs promoted from 2021 China League One
 Wuhan Three Towns
 Meizhou Hakka
 Zhejiang
 Chengdu Rongcheng

From Super League
Dissolved entries
 Chongqing Liangjiang Athletic
 Qingdao

Name changes
 Wuhan F.C. changed their name to Wuhan Yangtze River in March 2022.

Clubs information

Guangzhou (Round 16、23、24)、Chengdu Rongcheng (Round 17、19、27、28、30)、Henan Songshan Longmen (Round 19)、Zhejiang (Round 23)、Shandong Taishan (Round 29)、Beijing Guoan (Round 31) played in centralised venues (Haikou or Jinjiang), Guangzhou City (Round 25) played in away venues (Wuhua).

Managerial changes

Foreign players
Players name in bold indicates the player is registered during the mid-season transfer window.

 For Hong Kong, Macau, or Taiwanese players, if they are non-naturalized and were registered as professional footballers in Hong Kong's, Macau's, or Chinese Taipei's football association for the first time, they are recognized as native players. Otherwise they are recognized as foreign players.
 Naturalized players whose parents or grandparents were born in Mainland China, thus are regarded as local players.

League table

Results

Positions by round

Goalscorers

Top scorers

Top assists

Hat-tricks

Notes
(H) – Home team 
(A) – Away team

Awards

League attendance

References

External links
Current CSL table, and recent results/fixtures at Soccerway

Chinese Super League seasons
1
China